Gunnar Charles Garpö (13 October 1919 – 18 May 1976) was a Swedish bobsledder who competed from the early 1950s to the early 1960s. He won a bronze medal in the four-man event at the 1961 FIBT World Championships in Lake Placid, New York.

Garpö also finished seventh in the four-man event at the 1952 Winter Olympics in Oslo.

References
Bobsleigh four-man world championship medalists since 1930
Wallenchinsky, David (1984). "Bobsled: Four-man". In The Complete Book of the Olympics: 1896-1980. New York: Penguin Books. p. 561.

1919 births
1976 deaths
Swedish male bobsledders
Olympic bobsledders of Sweden
Bobsledders at the 1952 Winter Olympics
20th-century Swedish people